John Goudie (5 July 1857 – 23 April 1921) was a Scottish footballer who played as a centre forward.

Career
Born in Paisley, Goudie played club football for Abercorn, Rangers and Kilmarnock, and scored on his only appearance for Scotland in 1884.

References

1857 births
1921 deaths
Scottish footballers
Scotland international footballers
Abercorn F.C. players
Rangers F.C. players
Kilmarnock F.C. players
Association football forwards
Footballers from Paisley, Renfrewshire
Place of death missing